Ain't Misbehavin is an album by pianist Hank Jones featuring tunes associated with Fats Waller recorded in 1978 for the Galaxy label and released in 1985.

Reception

Allmusic awarded the album 4 stars, stating: "When this set (reissued on CD) was recorded, Hank Jones was the pianist in the Broadway show Ain't Misbehavin', a revue that celebrated Fats Waller's music. Jones never sounded like Waller, being a swing-to-bop transition player rather than a stride pianist, and he makes no effort to copy Fats during this brief program. ...Swinging if not particularly memorable music".

Track listing
 "Ain't Misbehavin'" (Fats Waller, Harry Brooks, Andy Razaf) - 6:38
 "Lounging at the Waldorf" (Waller) - 6:20
 "Mean to Me" (Fred E. Ahlert, Roy Turk) - 5:41
 "The Joint is Jumpin'" (Waller, Razaf, J. C. Johnson) - 4:28
 "Honeysuckle Rose" (Waller, Razaf) - 6:04
 "Squeeze Me" (Waller, Clarence Williams) - 8:27

Personnel 
Hank Jones  - piano
Richard Davis - double bass
Roy Haynes - drums
Bob Ojeda - trumpet (tracks 1, 3 & 5)
Teddy Edwards - tenor saxophone (tracks 1, 3 & 5)
Kenny Burrell - guitar (tracks 1, 3 & 5)

References 

1979 albums
Hank Jones albums
Galaxy Records albums
Fats Waller tribute albums